Thabiso "Boyzzz" Khumalo (born 27 October 1980 in Soweto) is a former South African footballer.

Early life and education
As a boy, Khumalo played under Farouk Khan at the "Super Centre" at the Transnet School of Excellence, before moving to the United States at the age of 16, settling in Kentucky. Khumalo attended Bethlehem High School in Bardstown, Kentucky, played club soccer for the Nelson County Assassins, Javanon and Lexington Premier, and played college soccer for Lindsey Wilson College and Coastal Carolina University while studying for a Bachelor of Science degree in Physical Education. During his college years Khumalo also played in the USL Premier Development League for both Mid-Michigan Bucks and Chicago Fire Premier.

Professional career
Khumalo was drafted by Chicago Fire in the 2005 MLS SuperDraft, but never played a game in MLS, and instead spent time with Charleston Battery in the USL First Division. He joined USL Second Division side Wilmington Hammerheads in 2006, and then returned to South Africa, where he played for the Vodacom League team Alexandra United for his former coach, Farouk Khan.

Khumalo returned to the United States in 2008, playing for the Pittsburgh Riverhounds in the USL Second Division, where he was named to the USL-2 Team of the Year, played all 20 games, and registered six goals and three assists to finish tied for sixth in points in the league. He was also named in the Team of the Week on four occasions, and named Player of the Week once.

On 10 September 2008, Khumalo signed on loan with D.C. United. He bagged his first goal for D.C. United during a 5–2 loss to Los Angeles Galaxy on 21 September 2008. Khumalo's success on loan led to United signing him on a permanent basis after the 2008 season ended. Khumalo was released by D.C. United on 27 July 2010.

In November 2010, the Louisville Lightning from the Premier Arena Soccer League announced they had signed Khumalo to play in the 2010–11 season.

On 14 March 2011, Khumalo signed a contract with Pittsburgh Riverhounds, now playing in the USL Pro league.

On 16 November 2013, Khumalo signed with Lansing United, of the National Premier Soccer League.

Khumalo signed with AFC Ann Arbor of the National Premier Soccer League for the 2016 season as an assistant coach and player.

Personal life
Khumalo is involved with a nonprofit organisation called the Umhlaba Vision Foundation, which serves to find opportunities for youth through sport and education.

References

External links
 MLS player profile

1980 births
Living people
Sportspeople from Soweto
Zulu people
South African soccer players
Flint City Bucks players
Expatriate soccer players in the United States
Chicago Fire FC players
Chicago Fire U-23 players
Charleston Battery players
USL First Division players
Wilmington Hammerheads FC players
Pittsburgh Riverhounds SC players
USL Second Division players
D.C. United players
USL League Two players
National Premier Soccer League players
AFC Ann Arbor players
Major League Soccer players
USL Championship players
Chicago Fire FC draft picks
Player-coaches
Association football forwards
Association football midfielders